Fusion ignition is the point at which a nuclear fusion reaction becomes self-sustaining. This occurs when the energy being given off by the reaction heats the fuel mass more rapidly than it cools. In other words, fusion ignition is the point at which the increasing self-heating of the nuclear fusion removes the need for external heating. This is measured by the fusion energy gain factor.

In the laboratory, fusion ignition was first achieved by the U.S. National Ignition Facility in 2022.

Research 

Ignition should not be confused with breakeven, a similar concept that compares the total energy being given off to the energy being used to heat the fuel. The key difference is that breakeven ignores losses to the surroundings, which do not contribute to heating the fuel, and thus are not able to make the reaction self-sustaining. Breakeven is an important goal in the fusion energy field, but ignition is required for a practical energy producing design.

In nature, stars reach ignition at temperatures similar to that of the Sun, around 15 million kelvins (27 million degrees F). Stars are so large that the fusion products will almost always interact with the plasma before their energy can be lost to the environment at the outside of the star. In comparison, man-made reactors are far less dense and much smaller, allowing the fusion products to easily escape the fuel. To offset this, much higher rates of fusion are required, and thus much higher temperatures; most man-made fusion reactors are designed to work at temperatures over 100 million kelvins (180 million degrees F).

Lawrence Livermore National Laboratory has its 1.8 MJ laser system running at full power. This laser system is designed to compress and heat a mixture of deuterium and tritium, which are both isotopes of hydrogen, in order to compress the isotopes to a fraction of their original size and fuse them into helium atoms (releasing neutrons in the process).

In January 2012, National Ignition Facility Director Mike Dunne predicted in a Photonics West 2012 plenary talk that ignition would be achieved at NIF by October 2012.

As of 2022, the NIF has achieved ignition, using the technique of inertial confinement fusion, which involves using high-energy lasers to homogeneously compress the outside of a nuclear fuel-containing pellet, taking advantage of the momentarily increased density inside of the pellet now forced to collapse inward, to ignite the fuel. Previously, ignition had only been achieved in the cores of detonating thermonuclear weapons, another form of inertial confinement fusion, which (instead of lasers) uses a conventional fission (U-235 or Pu-239/241) "sparkplug" to set the process alight.

Based on the tokamak reactor design, the ITER is intended to sustain fusion mostly by internal fusion heating and yield in its plasma a ten-fold return on power. Construction is expected to be completed in 2025.

The KSTAR tokamak center has achieved important milestones in developing their reactor as well. The Korean project is critically pertinent to ITER. In September 2022, the KSTAR tokamak reached and maintained a temperature of 100 million degrees C for 30 seconds without suffering operational damage.

Experts believe that achieving fusion ignition is the first step towards electricity generation using fusion power.

2021 and 2022 ignition reports 
The National Ignition Facility at the Lawrence Livermore National Laboratory in California reported in 2021 that it had triggered ignition in the laboratory on 8 August 2021, for the first time in the over-60-year history of the ICF program. The shot yielded 1.3 megajoules of fusion energy, an 8-fold improvement on tests done in spring 2021. NIF estimates that 230 kJ of energy reached the fuel capsule, which resulted in an almost 6-fold energy output from the capsule. A researcher from Imperial College London stated that the majority of the field agreed that ignition had been demonstrated.

In August 2022, the results of the experiment were confirmed in three peer-reviewed papers: one in Physical Review Letters and two in Physical Review E. Researchers at NIF tried to replicate the August result without success. However, on 11 December 2022, the United States Department of Energy said it would announce a "major scientific breakthrough", which was believed to be that scientists at the National Ignition Facility managed to trigger ignition. On 13 December 2022, the U.S. Department of Energy confirmed in an announcement on Twitter that fusion ignition was achieved.

See also 
 Burning plasma
 Inertial confinement fusion
 Laser Mégajoule
 List of plasma physics articles
 Timeline of nuclear fusion

References

External links 
 National Ignition Facility
 Laser Megajoule 

Ignition